The 1954 Texas gubernatorial election was held on November 2, 1954, to elect the governor of Texas. Incumbent Democratic Governor Allan Shivers was overwhelmingly reelected in the general election after defeating future Senator Ralph Yarborough in the Democratic primary.

Primaries

Democratic

Results

References

Texas gubernatorial elections
Texas
November 1954 events in the United States
1954 Texas elections